The 1986 Goodwrench 500 was a NASCAR Winston Cup Series race that took place on March 2, 1986, at North Carolina Motor Speedway in Rockingham, North Carolina.

A souvenir program for this race cost $5 USD ($ when adjusted for inflation). A Busch Grand National race known as the ProTecta Truck Bed Liner 200 was run the previous day while a pit crew challenge was done the morning before the companion race. Pit crew members had to put tires and fuel on the vehicle in the fastest time possible in order to win a championship.

Race report
It took four hours and nine minutes to resolve 492 laps of racing on a paved track spanning . The race started at noon and ended at 4:09 P.M.. Terry Labonte defeated Harry Gant by 0.63 seconds in front of 47,500 spectators with his 1986 Oldsmobile Delta 88. Terry Labonte's win also was his last victory for Billy Hagan and the #44 vehicle. Throughout the race, This was the most laps that Terry Labonte ever led in a race and won. It would, unfortunately, be the last win for anybody in the # 44 machine.

It would also be the first Cup win for a car other than a Ford or Chevy since Richard Petty's Pontiac went to victory lane in the July 4, 1984, Firecracker 400 at Daytona. This would count as the first win for an Oldsmobile since Buddy Baker at the 1980 Talladega race. This was the only points win for the Oldsmobile Delta 88. Benny Parsons did win the Winston Invitational at Atlanta in his Oldsmobile a little later, but that wasn't a points race.

Oldsmobile had a new body style based on the 88 series approved for NASCAR for the 1986 NASCAR Winston Cup Series season. Oldsmobile may have offered them a better incentive package of factory support, since Chevy had a big roster of teams at the time and Oldsmobile did not.

Labonte would earn $44,550 for this race ($ when adjusted for inflation). Kirk Bryant and Newsom tangled. Hillin got lost in the smoke and plowed into Newsom during the first 50 laps of the race. Only Kirk Bryant managed to finish the race in 18th place while Hillin and Newsom were knocked out of the race due to inflicting terminal damage to their vehicles.

Drivers who failed to qualify were Brad Heath, Mike Potter and Jerry Holden.

Out of the 40-driver grid; Trevor Boys was the only Canadian driver in an otherwise all-American grid. Rick Newsom would acquire the last-place finish due to a crash on lap 39. Earle Canavan would retire from NASCAR after this race; but not before making two abortive attempts at the 1986 Valleydale 500 and at the 1986 First Union 400. Darrell Waltrip would also take the points lead away from Geoff Bodine after this race.

Finishing order
Section reference: 

 Terry Labonte (No. 44)
 Harry Gant (No. 33)
 Richard Petty (No. 43)
 Morgan Shepherd (No. 47)
 Darrell Waltrip (No. 11)
 Cale Yarborough (No. 28)
 Bill Elliott (No. 9)
 Dale Earnhardt† (No. 3)
 Neil Bonnett† (No. 12)
 Lake Speed (No. 75)
 Kyle Petty (No. 7)
 Rusty Wallace (No. 27)
 Ron Bouchard† (No. 98)
 Tommy Ellis (No. 18)
 Alan Kulwicki† (No. 32)
 Tim Richmond† (No. 25)
 Buddy Arrington (No. 67)
 Kirk Bryant (No. 2)
 Jimmy Means (No. 52)
 Geoffrey Bodine* (No. 2)
 Michael Waltrip (No. 23)
 Ken Schrader (No. 90)
 Pancho Carter (No. 64)
 Jonathan Lee Edwards (No. 92)
 Davey Allison* (No. 95)
 Ronnie Thomas*† (No. 41)
 Dave Marcis* (No. 71)
 Ricky Rudd* (No. 15)
 Eddie Bierschawle* (No. 94)
 Phil Parsons* (No. 17)
 J. D. McDuffie*† (No. 70)
 Earle Canavan* (No. 01)
 Joe Ruttman* (No. 26)
 Bobby Allison* (No. 22)
 Trevor Boys* (No. 6)
 Wayne Slark* (No. 48)
 Greg Sacks* (No. 10)
 Bobby Wawak*† (No. 74)
 Bobby Hillin Jr.* (No. 8)
 Rick Newsom*† (No. 20)

† signifies that the driver is known to be deceased 
* Driver failed to finish race

Timeline
Section reference: 
 Start: Terry Labonte was leading the other cars as the green flag was waved in the air.
 Lap 6: First caution of the event, ended on lap 8.
 Lap 15: Second caution of the event, ended on lap 18.
 Lap 40: Third caution of the event due to a four-car accident, ended on lap 52.
 Lap 73: Fourth caution of the event, ended on lap 75.
 Lap 110: Fifth caution of the event, ended on lap 114.
 Lap 121: Sixth caution of the event, ended on lap 123.
 Lap 235: Seventh caution of the event, ended on lap 239.
 Lap 243: Eighth caution of the event, ended on lap 249.
 Lap 435: Ninth caution of the event due to a spun tire on turn two, ended on lap 441.
 Finish: Terry Labonte was officially declared the winner of the event.

Standings after the race

References

Goodwrench 500
Goodwrench 500
NASCAR races at Rockingham Speedway